I'm Going to Live by Myself is a 1982 Italian comedy film. It marked the feature film debut of Marco Risi. The film achieved a "cult" status and generated a 2008 sequel, Torno a vivere da solo.

Plot 
Milan, Italy early 1980s. A college student is finally able to rent a loft and live alone. But freedom so desired was marred by a thousand misfortunes, until the arrival in his life of a beautiful French, who will love and marry.

Cast 
 Jerry Calà as Giacomino
 Elvire Audray as Françoise
 Francesco Salvi as  "Telefono amico" friend
 Franz Di Cioccio as landlord
 Lando Buzzanca as Giuseppe
 Renato Scarpa as Professor

Release
The film was released in Italy on December 9, 1982

See also       
 List of Italian films of 1982

References

External links

1982 films
1982 comedy films
Films directed by Marco Risi
Films scored by Manuel De Sica
Italian comedy films
1980s Italian-language films
1980s Italian films